General elections were held in Tanzania on 28 October 2020 to elect the President and National Assembly. The presidential election was won by incumbent John Magufuli of the Chama Cha Mapinduzi party.

Background
In April 2019, Livingstone Lusinde, an MP for the ruling Chama Cha Mapinduzi party, suggested that holding a presidential election in 2020 was not a good idea due to the cost, and that the money should be used for development projects. The proposal was likely made in order to keep President John Magufuli in office till 2025, with Lusinde saying "no one can defeat president Magufuli" anyway.

Opposition parties Chadema, Alliance for Change and Transparency, and NCCR-Mageuzi announced they had started negotiations to form an alliance ahead of the election.

The election commission announced that the campaign would run from 26 August to 27 October 2020.

Electoral system
The president is elected by plurality voting; the candidate who receives the most votes is elected. Article 39(1) of the 1977 Constitution requires candidates to be Tanzanian citizens by birth, at least 40 years old, be nominated by a political party of which they are a member, be qualified to be an MP or a member of the Zanzibar House of Representatives, and not have any convictions related to tax evasion.

Presidential candidates

CCM

The ruling CCM (and its predecessor parties) has dominated the political scene since the nation attained independence in 1961. Following the restoration of multi-party politics in 1992, it has retained its popularity and the voters' confidence, winning all of the past five general elections (held in 1995, 2000, 2005, 2010, 2015). The previous election was won by John Magufuli, who ran for re-election for his second term.

Opposition

CHADEMA 
The main opposition party Chama cha Democracia na Maendeleo (CHADEMA) held its general council conference in Dar-es-salaam on 3 August 2020. A total of seven members completed their nomination forms for the position for the Union President.
Tundu Lissu, MP for Singida East
Lazaro Nyalandu, former Deputy Minister of Industry and Trade and MP for Singida North
Mayrose Majige, human development specialist
Isaya Mwita Charles, mayor of Dar Es Salaam
Leonard Manyama, political analyst
Gasper Mwanalyela, advocate for the High Court of Tanzania
Richmond Simba, advocate

A total of 453 of 456 party general council delegates attended the conference. The three names passed on by the central committee for the general council to vote on were, Tundu Lissu (405 votes), Lazaro Nyalandu (36 votes) and Mayrose Majige (1 vote), with Lissu chosen as CHADEMA's Union presidential candidate.

ACT-Wazalendo 
Alliance for Change and Transparency-Wazalendo part held their central committee elections on 5 August 2020. The party's 420 central committee members nominated ex foreign minister Bernard Membe with 97.61% vote as the union presidential candidate. Membe was expelled from CCM earlier in the year and moved over to ACT to be able to run for President.

Conduct
On 24 October 2020 the opposition claimed that the government was interfering in the election by making it more difficult to accredit thousands of opposition electoral observers, whose job is to ensure that the election is fair. The opposition has also claimed that the National Electoral Commission, whose members are appointed by the president, have barred the challenger Lissu from campaigning while letting the incumbent Magufuli campaign. From 27 October, the Tanzania Communication Regulatory Authority (TCRA) blocked several popular social media websites to restrict communication amid violence in the islands of Zanzibar, where dozens have been shot dead and tens have been injured by the police and other security forces.

According to Al Jazeera, "The election was marred by allegations of arrests of candidates and protesters, restrictions on agents of political parties to access polling stations, multiple voting, pre-ticking of ballots, and widespread blocking of social media." A local elections watchdog group noted a heavy deployment of military and police whose conduct created a “climate of fear”.

Results

President

National Assembly

International reactions
The Tanzania electoral watch panel, U.S. State Department, Commonwealth, and European Union were very critical about the elections.

On 10 November 2020, OHCHR published a declaration on the electoral process and its consequences. It was at once answered by Tanzania government.

References

Tanzania
Elections in Tanzania
Tanzania
Presidential elections in Tanzania
Tanzania
Election and referendum articles with incomplete results